Henry Grube (died 1582), of Devizes, Wiltshire, was an English politician.

He was a Member (MP) of the Parliament of England for Devizes in 1572. He was Mayor of Devizes in 1568 and 1573.

References

Year of birth missing
1582 deaths
English MPs 1572–1583
Mayors of Devizes